Korea's Next Top Model, season 2 (or Do-jeon Supermodel Korea, season 2) is the second season of the Korean reality television show in which a number of aspiring models compete for the title of Korea's Next Top Model and a chance to start their career in the modelling industry.

This season featured fifteen contestants in its final cast. The prizes for this season included: A cash prize of 100,000,000 Korean won, a cover shoot and editorial in W Magazine Korea, a contract with SK-II and a modelling contract with ESteem Entertainment.

The winner of the competition was 17-year-old Jin Jung-sun.

Contestants
(ages stated are at start of contest and use the Korean system of determining age)

Episodes

Episode 1

Original airdate: July 9, 2011

The contestants competed on a runway in a horse track. Most of the girls impressed the judges. The girls shot with a horse for their first photo shoot.
 First call-out: Lee Jenny
 Bottom two: Lee Eun-sook & Yoon Yoo-jin
 Eliminated: Yoon Yoo-jin
 Featured photographer: Jo Seon-hee
 Special guests: Lee Hyun-yi, Oh Mi-ran

Episode 2

Original airdate: July 16, 2011
 First call-out: Lee Jenny
 Bottom two: Lee Eun-sook & Jenny Fuglsang
 Eliminated: Lee Eun-sook
 Featured photographers: Seo Jung-ik & Kim Uk
 Special guests: Lee Soon-cheol, Soo-kyung, Kim Woo-bin

Episode 3

Original airdate: July 23, 2011
 First call-out: Song Hae-na
 Bottom two: Ko Jung-sun & Park So-yeon
 Eliminated: Ko Jung-sun
 Featured music video director: Jo Poong-yeon
 Special guests: Kwan Hyun-jin, Lee Hyun-yi, Ai Tominaga, Fatina Lim, Han Hye-jin, Bonnie Chen, Song Kyung-ah, Emma Pei, Fei Fei Sun, Zhang Ziyi, Hwi-hwang, Tiger JK, Kim Han-joon

Episode 4

Original airdate: July 30, 2011

 First call-out: Jin Jung-sun
 Bottom three: Jenny Fuglsang, Park So-yeon & Lee Song-i
 Eliminated: Jenny Fuglsang & Park So-yeon
 Featured photographers: Seo Jung-ik, Kim Young-joon
 Special guests: Lee Byung-joon, Gisele Bündchen, Kim Han-joon, Lee Seung-yeon

Episode 5

Original airdate: August 6, 2011
 First call-out: Um Yoo-jung
 Bottom two: Song Hae-na & Choi Ji-hye
 Eliminated: Choi Ji-hye
 Featured photographer: Kim Young-joon
 Special guests: J. Alexander, Hwang Ui-geon

Episode 6

Original airdate: August 13, 2011

 First call-out: Song Hae-na
 Bottom two: Ko Eun-bi & Lee Song-i
 Eliminated: Ko Eun-bi
 Featured photographer: Kim Han-joon
 Special guests: Jang Dong-min, Yu Se-yun, Yu Sang-moo, Park Si-yeon, Han Hye-yeon

Episode 7

Original airdate: August 20, 2011
 First call-out: Park Seul-gi
 Bottom two: Lee Sung-sil & Lee Song-i
 Eliminated: Lee Sung-sil
 Featured photographer: Kim Han-joon
 Special guests: Han Hye-yeon, Hwi-hwang

Episode 8

Original airdate: August 27, 2011
 First call-out: Park Seul-gi
 Bottom three: Lee Song-i, Lee Sun-young & Um Yoo-jung
 Eliminated: Lee Song-i & Lee Sun-young
 Featured photographer: Oh Joong-seok
 Special guests: Kim Jae-rim, Lee Young-jin

Episode 9

Original airdate: September 3, 2011

 First call-out: Park Seul-gi
 Bottom two: Lee Jenny & Um Yoo-jung
 Eliminated: Um Yoo-jung
 Featured photographer: Yoon Myeong-seob
 Special guests: Kim Joo-won, Um Jae-Yong, Kim Jung-han, Park Tae-Yoon

Episode 10

Original airdate: September 10, 2011

Recap episode.

Episode 11

Original airdate: September 17, 2011
 First call-out: Jin Jung-sun
 Bottom three: Song Hae-na, Lee Jenny & Park Seul-gi
 Eliminated: Song Hae-na & Lee Jenny
 Featured photographer: Jo Seon-hee
 Special guests: None

Episode 12

Original airdate: September 24, 2011

Reunion Episode

Episode 13

Original airdate: October 1, 2011
 Final Two: Jin Jung-sun & Park Seul-gi
 Korea's Next Top Model: Jin Jung-sun
 Featured photographer: Tyra Banks
 Special guests: J. Alexander

Episode 14

Original airdate: October 15, 2011

Top 2 Special Episode

Summaries

Call-out order

 The contestant was eliminated
 The contestant won the competition
 In episode 1, the pool of 26 semifinalists was reduced to 15.
 Episodes 4, 8, and 11 featured double eliminations with the bottom three contestants being in danger of elimination.
 Episode 10 was a recap episode.
 Episode 12 was a reunion episode.

Average  call-out order
Final two is not included.

Bottom two/three

 The contestant was eliminated after her first time in the bottom two/three
 The contestant was eliminated after her second time in the bottom two/three
 The contestant was eliminated after her fourth time in the bottom two/three
 The contestant was eliminated in the final judging and placed as the runner-up

Photo Shoot Guide
 Episode 1 Photo Shoots: Fierce Horse Jockeys (Casting) & Nude Career-Hungry Starlets
 Episode 2 Photo Shoot: Secret Rendezvous
 Episode 3 Music Video: Tiger JK's Drunken Tiger-Doo Doo Doo Wap Ba Balu
 Episode 4 Photo Shoot: Sexy Diva in Lingerie
 Episode 5 Photo Shoot: Wreckage Beach Group Shots
 Episode 6 Photo Shoot: Touch by Park Si-yeon Girlish & Elegant Twins
 Episode 7 Fashion Film: "Mysterious Temptation" in Saipan
 Episode 8 Photo Shoot: SK-II Group Beauty Shots
 Episode 9 Photo Shoot: Suspended Ballerinas
 Episode 11 Photo Shoot: Modernized Hanbok Couture
 Episode 13 Photo Shoot & Fashion Film: W Magazine Cover

Makeovers
 Eun-bi - "Shine Black" Dyed black
 Eun-sook - "Twiggy" Dyed red and lightbrown highlights
 Hae-na - "White Blonde" Dyed ice blonde and bob cut
 Jenny F. - "New Classic" Trimmed and bangs added
 Jenny L. - "Bohemian" Waved and light red highlights
 Ji-hye - "Tomboy" Dyed brown
 Jung-sun K. - "Aurora Mannish Cut" Kim So-yeon inspired short cut and dyed brown, red and purple
 Jung-sun J. - "Modernism" Dyed brown and eyebrows bleached
 Sun-young - "Girlish" Trimmed and bangs added
 Seul-gi - "Amelie Mushroom" Short cut and brown highlights
 So-yeon - "Modern Chic" Dyed ebony black
 Song-i - "Minimalism" Bob cut
 Sung-sil - "Cleopatra" Cleopatra inspired shoulder-length cut and bangs added
 Yoo-jung - "Matilda" Mathilda inspired bob cut, dyed orange and bangs added

Judges
 Jang Yoon-ju – Host & Main Judge
 Lee Hye-ju - Judge & V Magazine Editor
 Jo Seon-hee – Judge & Photographer
 Jung Goo-ho - Judge & Fashion Designer

Additional cast
 Ha Sang-baek – Designer & Photo Shoot Director

References 

Korea's Next Top Model